Kemerovo is an industrial city and the administrative center of Kemerovo Oblast, Russia, located at the confluence of the Iskitimka and Tom Rivers, in the major coal mining region of the Kuznetsk Basin. Population: 

The city was known as Shcheglovsk until March 27, 1932.

History
Kemerovo is an amalgamation of, and successor to, several older Russian settlements. A waypoint named Verkhotomsky ostrog was established nearby in 1657 on a road from Tomsk to Kuznetsk fortress. In 1701, the settlement of Shcheglovsk was founded on the left bank of the Tom; soon it became a village. By 1859, seven villages existed where modern Kemerovo is now: Shcheglovka (or Ust-Iskitimskoye), Kemerovo (named in 1734), Yevseyevo, Krasny Yar, Kur-Iskitim (Pleshki), Davydovo (Ishanovo), and Borovaya. In 1721, coal was discovered in the area. The first coal mines were established in 1907, later a chemical plant was established in 1916. By 1917, the population of Shcheglovo had grown to around 4,000 people.

The area's further development was boosted by the construction of a railway between Yurga and Kolchugino (now Leninsk-Kuznetsky) with a connection between Topki and Shcheglovo. Shcheglovo was granted town status on May 9, 1918, which is now considered to be the date of Kemerovo's founding; and was later known as Shcheglovsk. The town became the central location for the Kuzbass Autonomous Industrial Colony which was established there in 1921. 650 workers from 20 countries settled there and set up what became the Kemerovo Coke Chemical Plant. Some of their descendants visited the modern factory in 2011. On May 27, 1932, Shcheglovsk was renamed Kemerovo and became the administrative center of Kemerovo Oblast in 1943. In 2018, 60 people were killed by a fire in a shopping mall. In 2022, at least 20 people were killed by a fire in a nursing home.

Etymology 
The city was named after the village of Kemerovo, named after the surname of the first settlers of the Kemerovs. The ending "ovo" suggests a toponymic transition through a personal name. The village gave its name to the Kemerovo mine that arose under it. In 1925, the city of Scheglovsk was formed from two neighboring villages Kemerovo and Scheglovo, which in 1932 was renamed to Kemerovo after the name of the mine. According to another version, the name is based on the Turkic word kemer - "cliff, coast, cliff". The inhabitants of the city are called: Kemerovochanin, Kemerovochanka, Kemerovochane.<ref>Алабугина Ю. В.с Новый орфографический словарь русского языка с приложением. — М.: АСТ, 2016. — С. 411.</ref>

 Administrative and municipal status 
Kemerovo is the administrative center of the oblast and, within the framework of administrative divisions, it also serves as the administrative center of Kemerovsky District, even though it is not a part of it. As an administrative division, it is incorporated separately as Kemerovo City Under Oblast Jurisdiction—an administrative unit with a status equal to that of the districts. As a municipal division, Kemerovo City Under Oblast Jurisdiction is incorporated as Kemerovsky Urban Okrug.

 Economy 

The industrialization of Kemerovo was driven and underpinned by coal mining and by the heavy industry based on the availability of coal. It remains an important industrial city, built up during the Soviet period, with important steel, aluminum and machinery based manufacturing plants along with chemical, fertilizer, and other manufacturing industries. Since the disintegration of the Soviet Union, the city's industries have experienced a severe decline, creating high levels of unemployment. Major companies based in the city include Siberian Business Union.

 Transportation 
 Public transport 
The public transport network of Kemerovo consists of 70 city bus routes (including 6 seasonal), 63 suburban (including 35 seasonal), 53 public taxi routes (including 2 seasonal), 5 tram, and 9 trolleybus routes.

686 transport units enter the streets of the city every day, including:
 201 buses of city and suburban routes;
 364 units of route taxis;
 121 units of electric transport.

The fare in public transport is 20 rubles, in express buses - 21 rubles, in fixed-route taxis - 22 rubles (as of March 24, 2019). Free Wi-Fi was used in all Kemerovo trams to attract passenger traffic.

 Air transportation 

The city is served by Kemerovo International Airport that reside 2.5 kilometres to the south-east of the city. It has one runway with artificial turf of class B that length is 3200 meters. The airport is named after the Russian cosmonaut Alexei Leonov, a native of Kuzbass. There are two bus routes to the airport - 101 and 126.

 Railway transportation 
Kemerovo is linked to western Russia by a branch of the Trans-Siberian Railway and has the Kemerovo Railway station.

Education

Six higher education institutions are located in Kemerovo: Kemerovo State University, Kuzbass State Technical University, Kemerovo Institute of Food Industry (University), Kemerovo State Medical Academy, Kemerovo State Institute of Culture, Kemerovo Agricultural Institute and Kuzbass Economy and Justice Institute.

Sports
The public interest for bandy is widespread in Russia. 26,000 watched the opening game of the 2011–12 Russian Bandy League when local club Kuzbass played against Dynamo Moscow and Kuzbass is among the very best in the Russian Bandy League. The 2007 Bandy World Championship was held in the city. Female bandy only exists in a few places in Russia. Now Kemerovo is about to start it up. Moscow already had two multi-use indoor arenas where bandy can be played. Kemerovo got the first one in Russia specifically built for bandy (today also Khabarovsk and Ulyanovsk have it). Kuzbass plays the matches in the league at Khimik Stadium because of the big public interest. That arena has a capacity of 32000. As it also is equipped with artificial ice, Kemerovo has the best infrastructure for developing bandy in Russia.

Since 2013 there has been a "bandy on boots" tournament for national diasporas living in Kuzbass.

Climate
Kemerovo's position gives it a humid continental climate (Köppen Dfb'') with warm summers and long, severely cold winters. It has fairly low precipitation of around  annually.

City symbols

Coat of arms 

The heraldic description of the coat of arms of the city of Kemerovo is the following: in the crossed scarlet and black field, there is a narrow golden belt in the form of two diverging heads of grain ears, behind them there is a golden cogwheel that goes down; there is a silver retort in the middle, its neck tilted to the right.

The figures of the coat of arms of the city of Kemerovo symbolize the historically established main directions of the industrial development of the city:
 retort - chemical industry;
 cogwheel - mechanical engineering;
 ears of corn - the fertility of the land associated with the use of mineral fertilizers produced at the chemical enterprises of the city.

The colors used in the coat of arms symbolize:
 scarlet (red) - work, courage, energy, and strength;
 black color - wisdom, as well as the main wealth of the region, the center of which is the city of Kemerovo, - coal;
 silver (white) - pure thoughts, reliability, and kindness;
 gold (yellow) - wealth and prosperity.

Flag 

The flag of the city of Kemerovo is based on the city's coat of arms and repeats its symbolism. It is a rectangular double-sided panel with a width to length ratio of 2:3. It displays figures from the coat of arms of the city of Kemerovo. The colors used are red, black, yellow, and white.

Emblem 

The emblem of Kemerovo displays the monument of Mikhailo Volkov, the discoverer of coal in the area. The sculpture of Mikhailo Volkov displayed on the pedestal fragment styled like a rock. Behind the monument, there is a black triangle that symbolizes a spoil tip. The inscription of the city's name ("Кемерово" in Russian) resides on the diagonal from the left bottom side of the triangle. In the black part of the triangle, the year of the foundation of the city is displayed - "1918".

Numismatics  

In 2018 Bank of Russia issued into circulation the commemorative silver coin in denomination of 3 rubles "Centenary of the Foundation of Kemerovo" which displays the statue of Mikhailo Volkov.

Notable people
Yuri Arbachakov, boxer
Maria Barakova, mezzo-soprano; winner of Glinka and Tchaikovsky classical music competitions
Andreas Beck, association football player
Diana Borisova, rhythmic gymnast
Julia Chernogorova, Great British Bake Off contestant
Marina Domashenko, opera singer
Vyacheslav Ivanenko, retired race walker
Andrey Kirikov, lawyer and entrepreneur
Alexei Leonov, cosmonaut; honorable citizen of Kemerovo
Alexandra Merkulova, retired rhythmic gymnast
Slava Mogutin, artist
Wladimir Sukhatsky, TV producer
Aman Tuleyev, governor of Kemerovo Oblast
Nikolai Knyzhov, NHL player for the San Jose Sharks
Artem Vakhitov, kickboxer
Yuliya Karimova, Russian-born Azerbaijani volleyball player

Twin towns – sister cities

Kemerovo is twinned with:
 Salgótarján, Hungary

Gallery

See also
Immaculate Heart of Mary Church, Kemerovo

References

Notes

Sources

External links

Official website of Kemerovo 
Kemerovo Business Directory  

 
1701 establishments in Asia
Cities and towns in Kemerovo Oblast
Populated places established in 1701